This is a list of awards and nominations received by South Korean boy band 2AM.

Awards and nominations

Golden Disc Awards

Seoul Music Awards

Mnet Asian Music Awards

Melon Music Awards

KCEA Awards

Other awards

Rankings

References 

2AM